The Frankfurt Lions were a German professional men's ice hockey club from Frankfurt, Germany that played in the Deutsche Eishockey Liga. The club ceased operations in 2010 due to financial difficulty.

History
The hockey team was founded as a section of the renowned sports club Eintracht Frankfurt in 1959. After the section split from the club on March 5, 1991, the hockey team was renamed the Frankfurter ESC "Die Löwen" (meaning The Lions). When the DEL formed in 1994, the team became known as the Frankfurt Lions. It experienced its greatest success in 2004 when it won the DEL, but folded in 2010 after having had their licence revoked and was replaced by a phoenix club, the Löwen Frankfurt.

Retired numbers
Trevor Erhardt (#27)

Successes
The Lions won the DEL championship in 2004.

References

 
Lions
Ice hockey teams in Germany